The Men's 4 x 10 kilometre relay was held on 4 March 2011 at 13:00 CET The defending world champions were the Norwegian team of Eldar Rønning, Odd-Bjørn Hjelmeset, Tore Ruud Hofstad and Petter Northug while the defending Olympic champions were the Swedish team of Daniel Rickardsson, Johan Olsson, Anders Södergren, and Hellner.

Results

See also
2011 IPC Biathlon and Cross-Country Skiing World Championships – Men's relay

References

FIS Nordic World Ski Championships 2011